Queen Caroline may refer to:
 Caroline of Ansbach (1683–1737), queen of the Kingdom of Great Britain and the Kingdom of Ireland
 Caroline Matilda of Great Britain (1751–1775), queen of Norway and Denmark
 Maria Carolina of Austria (1752–1814), queen of Naples
 Caroline of Brunswick (1768–1821), queen of the United Kingdom of Great Britain and Ireland, queen of Hanover
 Caroline Amalie of Augustenburg (1796–1881), queen of Denmark
 Queen Caroline Estate, a council housing development in Hammersmith & Fulham, London